The following is a list of people who were born on South Georgia Island, or lived there for a period of time, or visited the island, and were prominent in its history.

 F.B. Allison
 Ludwig Allum
 J.G. Andersson
 W. Barlas
 Sinclair Begg
 Søren Berntsen
 Basil Biggs
 Noel Biggs
 E.B. Binnie
 Nigel Bonner
 Pauline Carr
 Tim Carr
 Duncan Carse
 J.M. Chaplin
 Jan Cheek
 Gerry Clark
 D.J. Coleman
 James Cook
 Finn Dahlberg
 Anthony de la Roché
 S. Duse
 Viktor Esbensen
 Wilhelm Filchner
 A.I. Fleuret
 Georg Forster
 Gunnar Gulbrandsen
 Leganger Hansen
 Ole Hauge
 Robert K. Headland
 Henrik Henriksen
 Fridthjof Jacobsen
 Solveig Gunbjörg Jacobsen
 Heinrich W. Klutschak
 Ludwig Kohl-Larsen
 Carl Anton Larsen
 Lauritz Larsen
 Kristen Løken
 Pat Lurcock
 Sarah Lurcock
 J.W. Matthew
 Clive Johnson
 Leonard Harrison Matthews
 Robert Cushman Murphy
 Nohart Nielsen
 Nils Olsen
 K.S. Pierce-Butler
 Dion Poncet
 Jérôme Poncet
 Sally Poncet
 Karl Schrader
 Ernest Shackleton
 Carl J. Skottsberg
 Eric Sörling
 Thoralf Sørlle
 R.E. Spivey
 Einar Strand
 Harald Studsrød
 Ernest Swinhoe
 Daniel R. Toner
 J.I. Wilson

References
 Headland, Robert K. (1984). The Island of South Georgia, Cambridge University Press. 

South Georgia and the South Sandwich Islands-related lists
South Georgia